Thandeka Zulu (born 25 November 1991) is a Zulu South African actress and musician known for her role as Nombuso in the South African telenovela Uzalo . She appeared in a film called Kwaito Church Service 2 and also portrayed pearl on e.tv drama series The girl is mine.

Early life and education 

Thandeka grew up singing and dancing in a small township in the northern city of Durban, KwaZulu-Natal called Hambanathi in Tongaat. She schooled at Nkosibomvu Secondary School in Tongaat, KwaZulu-Natal, where she matriculated.

Career 
In 2012, she joined a Durban-based music group called Afrosoul which was formed in the year 2000. After her debut in AfroSoul, Thandeka appeared in a film Kwaito Church Service 2 (2013) also played Pearl on eTV drama series The girl is mine. She made a major impact in South Africa with the portrayal of Nombuso in the South African telenovela Uzalo. Thandeka Zulu(Played Nombuso) was accused of having a bad attitude at work and was fired from Uzalo.

References 

1991 births
Living people
21st-century women singers